Rebecca Mahoney ( Hull, born 25 August 1983) is a former rugby union footballer and referee. She represented New Zealand and Wellington Rugby Football Union. She was a member of the Black Ferns 2006 and 2010 Rugby World Cup winning squads.

Personal life

Mahoney attended Alfredton Primary School and Palmerston North Girls' High School, where she was Dux Ludorum. She currently farms with her husband Luke in the Tararua District, New Zealand.

Refereeing career 
Mahoney was a rugby referee in New Zealand. She is the first of two women to be named to the New Zealand Elite Referee Squad. She reffed at the 2018 Commonwealth Games and the 2018 Rugby World Cup Sevens.

Mahoney was also named to the World Referee Squad and refereed the 2018 World Rugby Women's Sevens Series in Dubai, Japan, Australia, London, and New Zealand.

Mahoney's first international referring rugby union test was in Hong Kong. She retired from first class refereeing in 2021.

References

External links
 Black Ferns profile

1983 births
Living people
New Zealand women's international rugby union players
New Zealand female rugby union players
Female rugby union players
Rugby union players from Masterton
New Zealand women referees and umpires